Sergio Augusto López Ramírez (born 16 January 1961) is a Mexican politician from the Ecologist Green Party of Mexico. From 2006 to 2009 he served as Deputy of the LX Legislature of the Mexican Congress representing Aguascalientes.

References

1961 births
Living people
People from Aguascalientes City
Ecologist Green Party of Mexico politicians
21st-century Mexican politicians
Politicians from Aguascalientes
Members of the Congress of Aguascalientes
Deputies of the LX Legislature of Mexico
Members of the Chamber of Deputies (Mexico) for Aguascalientes